Spilomyia citima , the Western Hornet Fly, is a rare species of syrphid fly first officially described by Vockeroth in 1958. Hoverflies get their names from the ability to remain nearly motionless while in flight. The adults are also known as flower flies for they are commonly found around and on flowers, from which they get both energy-giving nectar and protein-rich pollen. The larvae are known as the short-tailed larvae suited for moist areas such as rot holes of trees.

Distribution
Canada, United States.

References

Further reading

 

Eristalinae
Insects described in 1958
Diptera of North America
Hoverflies of North America